Anthony Lloyd Obi (born 15 September  1965) is an English retired professional footballer who played as a forward in the Football League for Brentford, Plymouth Argyle, Walsall, Bristol Rovers and Oxford United. He spent the majority of his career in Belgium, most notably with K.V. Oostende, for whom he made 174 appearances in the top three divisions of Belgian football. He later became a youth coach with K.V. Oostende and still held the role as of August 2021.

Personal life 
Obi's son Matthieu Hubrouck also became a footballer. As of 2018, Obi had been running the 't Valentientje bar in Ostend for 23 years. The business was declared bankrupt in May 2019. As of August 2018, he was running Obi's Bar at K.V. Oostende's Versluys Arena.

Career statistics

References

1965 births
English footballers
English Football League players
Brentford F.C. players
Living people
Footballers from Birmingham, West Midlands
Association football forwards
Aston Villa F.C. players
Walsall F.C. players
Plymouth Argyle F.C. players
Bristol Rovers F.C. players
Oxford United F.C. players
K.V. Oostende players
K.S.V. Roeselare players
Challenger Pro League players
Belgian Pro League players
Black British sportspeople
English expatriate sportspeople in Belgium
English expatriate footballers
Expatriate footballers in Belgium